The 1998 La Flèche Wallonne was the 62nd edition of La Flèche Wallonne cycle race and was held on 15 April 1998. The race started in Charleroi and finished in Huy. The race was won by Bo Hamburger of the Casino team.

General classification

References

1998 in road cycling
1998
1998 in Belgian sport
April 1998 sports events in Europe